"By Strauss" is a 1936 song composed by George Gershwin, with lyrics by Ira Gershwin. It pays homage to the music of Johann Strauss, Sr. and Johann Strauss, Jr.

Lyrics

The singer sings how he doesn't like Broadway, Irving Berlin, Jerome Kern, Cole Porter and - in a case of self-mockery - George Gershwin. Instead he wants to dance to waltzes by father and son Strauss. The lyrics namedrop three of Strauss's best known compositions, namely An der schönen blauen Donau ("Let the Danube flow along"), Die Fledermaus ("and the Fledermaus") and Wein, Weib und Gesang ("Keep the wine and give me song").

History
Performed by the Gershwins at private parties, Vincente Minnelli included it in his 1936 revue The Show Is On, where it was introduced by Gracie Barrie and Robert Shafter.

It was then performed by Gene Kelly, Georges Guétary, and Oscar Levant (dubbed by Mack McLean) in Minnelli's 1951 film An American in Paris.

The song was also featured in the 2012 musical Nice Work If You Can Get It, performed by the character Estonia Dulworth in a counterpoint with a reprise of "Sweet and Lowdown".

Notable recordings 
Kenny Clarke/Francy Boland Big Band - All Smiles (1968)
Ella Fitzgerald - Ella Fitzgerald Sings the George and Ira Gershwin Songbook (1959)
Tony Jay - Poets on Broadway (2005)

Many other artists have also recorded the song.

References 

Songs with music by George Gershwin
Songs with lyrics by Ira Gershwin
1936 songs
Songs about classical music
Songs about musicians
Songs about dancing
Songs about Austria